Southern Literary Journal (SLJ) was established in 1968 by editors Louis D. Rubin, Jr. and C. Hugh Holman. In 2015 the journal changed focus from literary to interdisciplinary content, changed its name to south, and became more closely related to UNC Press. It is published by the University of North Carolina Press biannually.

References

American Southern literary magazines
Biannual magazines published in the United States
Magazines established in 1968
Magazines published in North Carolina
Mass media in Chapel Hill-Carrboro, North Carolina